Bruce Wilbur Beatty, (July 6, 1922 – March 21, 2011) was a Canadian graphic designer best known as being chiefly responsible for designing the emblems of the Canadian Honours System, starting with the badge of the Order of Canada in 1967.  The emblem is the shape of a snowflake – just as every snowflake is different, so is every member of the Order. As of 2004, he had been in attendance at every Order investiture ceremony. Beatty was made a member of the order in 1990. In 1977 he was made a Fellow of the Royal Heraldry Society of Canada.

Beatty was also responsible for creating the emblem of the Order of British Columbia during the 1980s and made alterations to the Victoria Cross for the Canadian Honour System in 1993. He has lectured to the Monarchist League of Canada.

Beatty died on March 21, 2011.

In 2012, Captain Beatty was posthumously awarded, the Saskatchewan Order of Merit.

Honours and arms

Honours
Appointments
 Fellow of the Royal Heraldry Society of Canada (1977 – March 21, 2011)
 Commander of the Most Venerable Order of the Hospital of Saint John of Jerusalem
 Member of the Order of Canada (April 20, 1990 – March 21, 2011)
 Member of the Saskatchewan Order of Merit (2011; posthumous)

Medals
 Canadian Volunteer Service Medal and bar
 Special Service Medal
 Queen Elizabeth II Coronation Medal (1953)
 Canadian Centennial Medal (1967)
 Queen Elizabeth II Silver Jubilee Medal (1977)
 125th Anniversary of the Confederation of Canada Medal (1992)
 Queen Elizabeth II Golden Jubilee Medal (2002)
 Canadian Forces Decoration and two bars
 Service Medal of the Order of St John

Arms

References

External links

List of fellows of the Royal Heraldry Society of Canada
speech by Adrienne Clarkson thanking Beatty
Image of Beatty at the 100 Order of Canada investiture
Bruce Beatty was the man behind the Order of Canada," Obituary, The Globe and Mail, 22 May 2011

1922 births
2011 deaths
Canadian Army officers
20th-century Canadian civil servants
Canadian graphic designers
Commanders of the Order of St John
Fellows of the Royal Heraldry Society of Canada
Members of the Saskatchewan Order of Merit
Members of the Order of Canada
People from Melfort, Saskatchewan
Royal Canadian Air Force personnel of World War II